The Providence Chapel originally came from Darby End/Hand near Netherton. It was one of the first buildings to be rebuilt on the Black Country Living Museum site. It is an excellent example of a typical Black Country Methodist chapel.

Chapel Origins
The Darby family brought a plot of land on Northfield Road and in 1828 work began on building the chapel. The ‘Providence Chapel’ was named after a chapel in Epwarth, Lincolnshire and was affiliated to the Methodist New Connection. The chapel played a central part in the life of the local community for one hundred and fifty years. It was a well-known centre of Christian beliefs and practices with a strong tradition of choral singing. The chapel was also a centre of education and welfare; it helped to alleviate hardship amongst the low paid workers of the Black Country. Trustees of the chapel created clubs like the Darby Hand Doctors Club to provide medical assistance.

Relocation 

In May 1971 the Sunday school building was destroyed by a fire, the chapel was closed in August 1974. The land was set to be sold and the building demolished. The Black Country Living Museum was invited to save some of the pews. The Museum was in fact interested in saving the whole building and in November 1975 the building was dismantled and the larger parts transferred to the Museum site. There were however problems with certain bricks which could not be used again. As luck would have it, it was possible to dismantle another chapel in Wolverhampton Street, Dudley which dated from 1828-9. This provided the right kind of brick for the chapel. Reconstruction at the Museum began in June 1977 and took two years, the chapel was dedicated in 1979.

The Building 
The chapel is a simple, brick-built, rectangle with two small rear extensions. The front is ‘relieved’ by an impressive entrance of rendered brick. The interior is plain and functional with a small lobby underneath a gallery that runs down the sides and rear of the chapel. The side galleries are supported by fluted columns with ornate capitals that divide the interior into aisles.  In the middle stands a dominant pulpit where the Minister would be able to see the whole of his congregation. The pulpit is situated below a scrolled banner painted on the wall which proclaims “Worship the Lord in the Beauty of Holiness” .

References 

1828 establishments in England
Black Country Living Museum